A Noose of Light is a novel by Seamus Cullen published in 1986.

Plot summary
A Noose of Light is a novel in which djinni do evil things to humans.

Reception
Dave Langford reviewed A Noose of Light for White Dwarf #78, and stated that "the humour and cruelty are faithful to the source: evil-doers are unremittingly punished, while the reward of virtue is often skimpy until after you're dead. Unevenly paced, but an OK read".

Reviews
Review by Chris Morgan (1986) in Fantasy Review, April 1986
Review by Don D'Ammassa (1986) in Science Fiction Chronicle, #84 September 1986
Review by Mark Greener (1986) in Vector 135

References

1986 novels